Zulfiqer Russell (born 13 November 1977) is a Bangladeshi lyricist and journalist. He is currently the editor of the online news site, The Bangla Tribune. He won the Bangladesh National Film Award for Best Lyrics for the film Putro (2018). He was the winner of the Channel i Music Awards in 2008, 2010, 2013 and 2022 and also received the Mirchi Music Awards (Bangla) award for the Song of the Year in the Modern Song category for, "Shabuj Chilo". On 2020 he was awarded CJFB Performance Award 2019 as best lyricist. He had also worked with renowned Indian singers and composers including Grammy and Academy Award (Oscar) winner musician A. R. Rahman. He wrote the official theme song ‘Ektai Achhe Desh’ of the Golden Jubilee of Bangladesh Independence sang by fifty renowned singers of Bangladesh.

Early life and education 

Zulfiqer Russell was born on 13 November 1977, in the Dhaka District of Bangladesh. He is the son of Abdus Salam (father) and Saleha Begum (mother). He studied at the Muslim Modern Academy, and graduated from Dhaka City College.

Career 
At the beginning of 1993, Russell's poems were featured in a number of publications including Ajker Kagoj. His first poem was "Kofine Ojoggo Purush". He is the only lyricist in Bangladesh who received an appreciation letter from the Honorable Prime Minister Sheikh Hasina. He wrote the official welcome song "O Prithibi Ebar Ese Bangladesh Nao Chine" for the 2011 ICC Cricket World Cup held in Bangladesh, India, and Sri Lanka. He penned around thousand songs since 1994, many of which were sung by prominent artists. He was one of the top lyricists of the year 2011.
Russell is currently the editor of the Bangla Tribune, and has previously written for publications such as The Daily Ittefaq and The Daily Janakantha. He has also worked for Maasranga Television and Bangla newspapers, Daily Amader Shomoy, Ajker Kagoj and Banglabazar Patrika.

In addition to working with fellow Bangladeshi artists, He has also worked with renowned Indian singers and composers including Grammy and Academy Award (Oscar) winner musician A R Rahman, he is the first Bangladeshi lyricist who collaborated with A R Rahman. He also work with Hariharan, Sonu Nigam, Javed Ali, Palak Muchhal, Benny Dayal, Zubin Garg, Nachiketa, Anjan Dutt, Indranil Sen, Rupankar Bagchi, Raghab Chatterjee, Anwesha, Chinmoyee, Iman Chakrabarty. Zulfiqer Russell wrote the official theme song ‘Ektai Achhe Desh’ of the Golden Jubilee of Bangladesh Independence sang by fifty renowned singers of Bangladesh. He wrote a theme song 'Joy Bangabandhu' in the Hindi language for the state ceremony on the hundred-year celebration of Father of the Nation Bangabandhu Sheikh Mujibur Rahman. This song is composed and sung by Academy award winner A. R. Rahman. Zulfiqer Russell wrote another theme song ‘Hoyeche ki Sonar Bangla’ for the state ceremony on the hundred-year celebration of Father of the Nation Bangabandhu Sheikh Mujibur Rahman. He places himself as Publicity and Publication Secretary of Music Alliance Bangladesh (Sangeet Oikko Bangladesh).

He is also active in a various organisation like the Lyricists Association of Bangladesh (Geetikobi Shongho) where he places himself as Organizing Secretary. By this platform they want amendments on copyright law to stop the unauthorized use of lyrics.

Film appearance 
 Akash Koto Durey, 2013. Director: Samia Zaman

Discography

Awards

References

External links

 
 

Living people
1977 births
21st-century Bangladeshi male singers
21st-century Bangladeshi singers
Bangladeshi journalists
Bangladeshi lyricists
Best Lyricist National Film Award (Bangladesh) winners
People from Dhaka District